Rana Mahmud gizi Afandizade (born November 29, 1929) is an Azerbaijani architect, Honored Architect of the Azerbaijan SSR.

Biography 
Rana Afandizade was born on November 29, 1929, in Baku. In 1954 she graduated from Moscow Architectural Institute. In 1963 he started working at the Institute of Architecture and Art of the Azerbaijan National Academy of Sciences, in 1989-1998 he headed the department of urban planning and modern architecture. In 1967 she defended her dissertation. For a long time she was a member of the board of the Union of Architects of Azerbaijan.

Rana Afandizade is the author of a number of residential projects. She is the author of more than 50 works on architecture and urban planning of Azerbaijan and Baku, and 5 monographs.

Awards 
 Honored Architect of the Azerbaijan SSR — December 5, 1979
 Order of the Badge of Honour — 1986
 Shohrat Order — April 19, 2000
 Medal named after Mikayil Useynov — 2012
 2nd degree Labor Order — November 28, 2019

References 

Recipients of the Shohrat Order
Azerbaijani women architects
20th-century Azerbaijani architects
1929 births
Living people